Grzybno may refer to:

Grzybno, Greater Poland Voivodeship (west-central Poland)
Grzybno, Brodnica County in Kuyavian-Pomeranian Voivodeship (north-central Poland)
Grzybno, Chełmno County in Kuyavian-Pomeranian Voivodeship (north-central Poland)
Grzybno, Kartuzy County in Pomeranian Voivodeship (north Poland)
Grzybno, Kościerzyna County in Pomeranian Voivodeship (north Poland)
Grzybno, Drawsko County in West Pomeranian Voivodeship (north-west Poland)
Grzybno, Gryfino County in West Pomeranian Voivodeship (north-west Poland)
Grzybno, Myślibórz County in West Pomeranian Voivodeship (north-west Poland)
Grzybno, Sławno County in West Pomeranian Voivodeship (north-west Poland)